Off The Desk is a live album by Fairport Convention. It was recorded on Fairport Convention's Winter Tours during 2004 and 2005 and the double CD features many tracks previously unavailable as live recordings.

Track listing

Personnel
Simon Nicol – vocals, guitar
Dave Pegg – vocals, bass guitar, mandolin on "Canny Capers"
Ric Sanders – violin, mandolin on "Morris Medley"
Chris Leslie – vocals, bouzouki, mandolin, violin, Native American flute
Gerry Conway – drums, percussion

special guests on "Wait for the Tide to Come In":
PJ Wright – slide guitar
Anna Ryder – accordion

Release history

External links
 

Fairport Convention live albums
2006 live albums